Nargiz Aliyeva (born 22 March 2002) is an Azerbaijani footballer who plays as a goalkeeper for Turkis Super League club Kdz. Ereğli Belediye Spor, and the Azerbaijan women's national team.

Club career 
Aliyeva played for WFC Tbilisi Nike  in the neighbor vountry Georgia in the 2021-22 season. In December 2021, she moved to Turkey, and joined Kdz. Ereğli Belediye Spor to play in the Women's Super League.

International career 
Aliyeva was admitted to the Azerbaijan women's national football team in March 2020. She dtook part at the UEFA Women's Euro 2022 qualifying Group D  and at the 2023 FIFA Women's World Cup qualification – UEFA Group E matches on the bench.

References 

2002 births
Living people
Women's association football goalkeepers
Azerbaijani women's footballers
Azerbaijan women's international footballers
Azerbaijani expatriate footballers
Azerbaijani expatriate sportspeople in Georgia (country)
Expatriate footballers in Georgia (country)
Azerbaijani expatriate sportspeople in Turkey
Expatriate women's footballers in Turkey
Turkish Women's Football Super League players
Karadeniz Ereğlispor players